Haskell Noyes (July 22, 1886 – December 8, 1948) was an American college basketball player and coach as well as a noted conservationist.

Born into a well-to-do family of Milwaukee, Wisconsin, Noyes attended Yale University from 1904 to 1908. He played for their basketball team and was the captain for his final two seasons. As a senior in 1907–08, Noyes was selected as a consensus All-American by the Helms Athletic Foundation.

After graduation, Noyes spent the next three years in his home state, serving as the head coach of the University of Wisconsin–Madison's basketball team. In three seasons in charge of the Badgers, Noyes compiled a 26–15 overall record. Two years later, he found himself in charge of Yale's team. For the 1913–14 season, his only as their head coach, Yale recorded an 11–7 record.

During his time in Wisconsin, Noyes became greatly interested in conserving the environment. And although he had earned a law degree from the University of Wisconsin Law School, he decided to pursue his passion. In  1926, he proposed a law that centralized conservationism in Wisconsin under a director and six unpaid commissioners. In 1930, he established the Haskell Noyes Conservation Warden Efficiency Award, which is still given annually to the person selected as the top Warden in Wisconsin.

Noyes died on December 8, 1948, several days after falling and fracturing his skull. He was 62 years old. In 2000, he was posthumously inducted into the Wisconsin Conservation Hall of Fame.

Head coaching record

References

External links

1886 births
1948 deaths
All-American college men's basketball players
American conservationists
American men's basketball players
American military personnel of World War I
Basketball coaches from Wisconsin
Basketball players from Milwaukee
Guards (basketball)
Sportspeople from Milwaukee
University of Wisconsin Law School alumni
Wisconsin Badgers men's basketball coaches
Yale Bulldogs men's basketball coaches
Yale Bulldogs men's basketball players